Patrik Juhola (born 16 December 2003) is a Finnish ice hockey player who is currently under a contract with Porin Ässät of the Liiga, his contract ends after the 2024–25 season. Juhola was selected as the best player of the month in the U20 SM-sarja in the 2021–22 season when he put up 39 points in 40 games as a 17 year old. Juhola has played 3 WJC games putting up one point.

According to scouting reports, Juhola has a powerful and fast wrist shot and he is good at passing the puck to his wingers and has great puck control.

Career

Junior 
Juhola started his career playing for HC Nokia's U16 team. In the U16 SM-sarja Q. After he put up 29 points in 27 games, he got promoted to the U16 SM-sarja team, where he put up 15 points in 18 games.

On the next season, Juhola moved on to play for Porin Ässät U17 where he put up 21 points in 14 games, after which he got to play in the U18 team. He played 3 games without any points, after which he played in the U18 Ässät Akatemia for one game.

The next season he played as captain for the Ässät U18 team where he played 30 games with 33 points.

The next season he got to play in the U20 Ässät team where he played 40 games with 39 points, which means he had a PPG of 0.98. He also got to play in the Hermes of the Mestis as a loanee. He played for three games and put up three points. He played three playoff games with Ässät U20 and scored 4 points.

Professional

Porin Ässät (2021–) 
In 2021, Patrik Juhola signed a contract with Ässät until the 2024–25 season. Juhola mainly plays for the Ässät U20 team and occasionally as a loanee for other organizations.

Career statistics

Regular season and playoffs

References 

2003 births
Living people
Ässät players
Finnish ice hockey forwards